The Luchtmobiel Speciaal Voertuig (LSV) is a small, open off-road vehicle that can be transported by air. It is specifically designed for, and used by, the Dutch Airmobile Brigade of the Royal Netherlands Army. The LSV is nicknamed affectionately 'playmobiel' (Playmobil) by Dutch soldiers.

History
With the establishment of the airmobile brigade on 1 May 1992, a need arose for specific equipment for this new unit. For example, a vehicle was needed to provide the brigade with mobility on the ground and to be able to be transported in or under a transport helicopter. This multifunctional vehicle was named 'Luchtmobiel Speciaal Voertuig', which can be roughly translated into 'Airmobile Special Vehicle'. The weight of this vehicle was of great importance because otherwise the range and the loading capacity of the helicopter were to be severely limited. During the procurement process several designs were presented by a range of companies. After a first selection, four candidates remained:
 "Cobra" of the British Longline
 The British "Saker" of Wessex
 The "A3" of Auverland from France
 "Véhicule Légère Aeromobile" of the French Lohr

However, none of the vehicles available on the market in 1994 could meet the weight requirement of 1200 kg. Therefore, the requirement was adjusted to 1400 kg. After further tests, the "Véhicule Légère Aeromobile" from the French manufacturer Lohr proved to meet the adjusted requirements and Defense therefore opted for this vehicle. Since the intention of the Royal Netherlands Army was to put the vehicles into use during the preparations of the brigade (in the period 1992-1994), the project was delayed considerably. As an interim solution, the brigade used open Mercedes-Benz off-road vehicles of type GD-290.

In 1996 the order for the LSV was finally placed. The vehicles were produced under license in the Netherlands by SP Aerospace and Vehicle systems. The first copies were delivered at the end of 1998. The Mechanic Central Workshop of the Army then implemented the conversion of the vehicles into specific AT or GWT execution. The last LSV was delivered at the beginning of 2001.

Design
The vehicle consists of a tubular frame with a polyester body, it has two seats and an open load area. It does not have a crumple zone and is therefore perceived as unsafe under peace conditions. The LSV has an automatic gearbox and a permanent all-wheel drive. The engine is from Peugeot.

Types
There are 3 types of the Luchtmobiel Special Voertuig (LSV) in use by the Royal Netherlands Army:
 General service (AG), which are used, for example, for the transport of connecting means and ammunition;
 Wounded transport (GWT), used for transporting wounded soldiers or civilians;
 Anti-tank (AT), these are used for transporting anti-tank weapons and the associated ammunition.

Operators

Current operators
 : Royal Netherlands Army 
11th Airmobile Brigade – 160 vehicles, to be replaced in 2024.

Images

See also
11th Airmobile Brigade

References

External links
11 Luchtmobiele Brigade
LSV

Military vehicles of the Netherlands
Military light utility vehicles
All-wheel-drive vehicles